Haitham Hussein (born November 16, 1978) is a Syrian Kurd novelist, an critique writer and reviewer. Born on November 16, 1978 in the city of Amuda in the province of Hasaka, Syria. Hussein worked for years as a freelance journalist and critique writer for the major Arab newspapers such as AlHayat, Assafir, Al Bayan, AlQuds, Alarabi and several other Arab papers and journals. He lived near Damascus, and his house in the Eastern Ghouta was bombarded, he had to leave in mid-2012.
In 2015, Hussein founded Alriwaya.net website about the Arabic novel and the criticism. The novel and criticism is his first passion in life. Hussein tries to make Arabic novels going beyond the traditional style.

He is married and has a two daughters, Heivy and Rose.

Novels
 Aram: the Descendant of Unspoken Pains (2007)
 Hostages of Sin (2010)
 Needle of  Horror (2014)
 A Weed in Paradise(2017)

References

1978 births
Syrian novelists
Syrian literary critics
Living people
Syrian Kurdish people